Shall We Dance? is a Philippine reality dance competition program on  and was hosted by Lucy Torres-Gomez from November 6, 2005 to March 28, 2010, and was replaced by My Darling Aswang. This is the first ever television program in the Philippines to use a steadicam.

Format
The show features a ballroom dancing competition between three celebrities. Each celebrity is paired up with a dance instructor. The next portion of the show is a competition between three non-showbiz dance pairs. All performances are evaluated by a panel of three judges. The last portion of the show is a dance instructional by one of the judges, Ednah Ledesma. This portion features a step-by-step lesson by Ledesma of a ballroom dance. In 2008, the show was reformatted with a new title Shall We Dance: Search for the Dance Superstars.

Hosts and judges

Main host
 Lucy Torres, dubbed "Asia's Dance Goddess"

Co-hosts
 Arnell Ignacio
 Jon Avila
 Victor Basa
 John Lapus
 Tuesday Vargas
 Wilma

Judges
 Ednah Ledesma
 Regine Tolentino
 Douglas Nierras

Guest co-hosts
Ryan Agoncillo
Paolo Bediones

Former judges
Audie Gemora

Former host
 Dominic Ochoa

Awards and recognitions

22nd PMPC Star Awards for Television
 Best Talent Search Program (2008)
 Best Talent Search Program Host – Lucy Torres-Gomez, Arnel Ignacio, and Dominic Ochoa (2008)

See also
List of programs broadcast by TV5 (Philippine TV network)
List of programs aired by TV5 (Philippine TV network)

References

TV5 (Philippine TV network) original programming
Dance in the Philippines
2005 Philippine television series debuts
2010 Philippine television series endings
Philippine reality television series
Filipino-language television shows